Roderick MacKenzie may refer to:

 Roddie MacKenzie (b. 1901), Scottish footballer
 Roderick MacKenzie (British Army officer), a British Army officer
 Roderick MacKenzie (politician) (1868–1957), Canadian politician
 Roderick Mackenzie, 4th Earl of Cromartie (1904–1989), a Scottish soldier and peer